Pârâu or Pârâul may refer to several places in Romania:

Pârâu, a village in Brăneşti Commune, Gorj County
Pârâu Boghii, a village in Pârgărești Commune, Bacău County
Pârâu Boia,  a village in Jupânești Commune, Gorj County
Pârâu-Cărbunări,  a village in Lupșa Commune, Alba County
Pârâu Crucii,  a village in Pogăceaua Commune, Mureș County
Pârâu Crucii,  a village in Râciu Commune, Mureș County
Pârâu Mare,  a village in Ibăneşti Commune, Mureș County
Pârâu Negrei,  a village in Breaza Commune, Suceava County
Pârâu Negru,  a village in Mihăileni, Botoșani Commune, Botoşani County
Pârâu Viu,  a village in Berlești Commune, Gorj County
Pârâu de Pripor and Pârâu de Vale,  villages in Godinești Commune, Gorj County
Pârâul Rece,  a village in Predeal Town, Braşov County
Pârâul Cârjei and Pârâul Pântei,  villages in Borca Commune, Neamţ County
Pârâul Fagului,  a village in Poiana Teiului Commune, Neamţ County
Pârâul Mare,  a village in Ceahlău Commune, Neamţ County
Pârâu (Valea Nouă), a river in Bihor County